Sácama is a town and municipality in the Department of Casanare, Colombia.

Climate
Sacama has a very wet tropical rainforest climate (Köppen Af), although it borders very closely on the tropical monsoon climate (Am) found further east.

References

Municipalities of Casanare Department